John Curley Jr. (born March 14, 1965 in Trenton, New Jersey) is an American musician best known as the bassist for, and co-founder of, the Afghan Whigs. When he co-founded the Afghan Whigs, Curley was working as a staff photographer for the Cincinnati Enquirer. He also produced or engineered the Ass Ponys' first four albums, all of which were recorded at his recording studio, Ultrasuede Studios. Ultrasuede Studios is located in the Cincinnati neighborhood of Camp Washington. As of 2016, Curley still works at Ultrasuede.

Personal life
Curley and his wife, Michelle, have two children. His father, John Curley, is the former CEO of Gannett Company.

References

1965 births
Living people
Musicians from Trenton, New Jersey
The Afghan Whigs members
Record producers from Ohio
American audio engineers
20th-century American bass guitarists
Engineers from New Jersey